George Simpson may refer to:

 Sir George Simpson (HBC administrator) (1792–1860), Scottish explorer and governor of Rupert's Land
 George Buchan Simpson (1820–1892), Scottish art collector, connoisseur and patron of Scottish painters
 George Bowen Simpson (1838–1915), politician and judge in New South Wales, Australia
  George Simpson (Canadian politician) (1858–1906), politician in Prince Edward Island, Canada
 George Simpson (Western Australian politician) (1856–1906), member of the Legislative Assembly of Western Australia
 George Simpson (Queensland politician) (1849–1919), member of the Parliament of Queensland
 George W. Simpson (1870–1951), New York politician and judge
 George Simpson (footballer, born 1876) (1876–1955), English football player for Doncaster Rovers and Chesterfield
 George Simpson (footballer, born 1883) (1883–?), English footballer for Sheffield Wednesday and West Bromwich Albion
 George Simpson (footballer, born 1933) (1933–2012), English football player for Mansfield Town and Gillingham
 Sir George Simpson (meteorologist) (1878–1965), meteorologist for Robert Falcon Scott's Antarctic expedition
 George Simpson (botanist) (1880–1952), New Zealand botanist
 George Goodman Simpson (1896–1990), Australian flying ace
 George Simpson (Royal Navy officer) (1901–1972), British admiral
 George Simpson (sprinter) (1908–1961), American runner
 George Gaylord Simpson (1902–1984), American paleontologist
 George Simpson, Baron Simpson of Dunkeld (born 1942), British businessman
 George Simpson (golfer) (1887–1920), Scottish professional golfer

See also
George Simson (1767–1848), MP